Mimeresia is a genus of butterflies in the family Lycaenidae. The species of this genus are endemic to the Afrotropical realm.

Species
Mimeresia cellularis (Kirby, 1890)
Mimeresia debora (Kirby, 1890)
Mimeresia dinora (Kirby, 1890)
Mimeresia drucei (Stempffer, 1954)
Mimeresia favillacea (Grünberg, 1910)
Mimeresia issia Stempffer, 1969
Mimeresia libentina (Hewitson, 1866)
Mimeresia moreelsi (Aurivillius, 1901)
Mimeresia moyambina (Bethune-Baker, 1904)
Mimeresia neavei (Joicey & Talbot, 1921)
Mimeresia pseudocellularis Stempffer, 1968
Mimeresia russulus (Druce, 1910)
Mimeresia semirufa (Grose-Smith, 1902)

References

Poritiinae
Lycaenidae genera